The 2009–10 Biathlon World Cup - World Cup 1 was the opening event of the season and has been held in Östersund, Sweden, from 2 December until  6 December 2009

Schedule of events
The time schedule of the event stands below

Medal winners

Men

Women

Achievements
 Best performance for all time

 , 2 place in Individual
 , 7 place in Individual
 , 22 place in Individual
 , 20 place in Sprint
 , 25 place in Sprint
, 82 place in Sprint
, 89 place in Sprint
, 105 place in Sprint
, 106 place in Sprint
 , 5 place in Individual
 , 12 place in Individual
 , 19 place in Individual
 , 25 place in Individual
 , 48 place in Individual
 , 5 place in Sprint
 , 7 place in Sprint
 , 14 place in Sprint
 , 41 place in Sprint
 , 43 place in Sprint
 , 58 place in Sprint
 , 63 place in Sprint
 , 88 place in Sprint

 First World Cup race

, 69 place in Individual
, 93 place in Individual
, 96 place in Individual
, 121 place in Individual
, 125 place in Individual
, 126 place in Individual
, 130 place in Individual
, 74 place in Sprint
, 95 place in Sprint
, 114 place in Sprint
, 126 place in Sprint
, 131 place in Sprint
, DSQ in Sprint
 , 29 place in Individual
 , 61 place in Individual
 , 62 place in Individual
 , 73 place in Individual
 , 81 place in Individual
 , 105 place in Individual
 , 111 place in Individual
 , 75 place in Sprint
 , 82 place in Sprint
 , 89 place in Sprint
 , 95 place in Sprint
 , 98 place in Sprint
 , 101 place in Sprint
 , 108 place in Sprint

References

- World Cup 1, 2009-10 Biathlon World Cup
December 2009 sports events in Europe
Sports competitions in Östersund
Biathlon competitions in Sweden
2009 in Swedish sport